NLO may refer to:

Fernald Feed Materials Production Center
Naval liaison officer
Naval Live Oaks Reservation, Florida, United States
New London Orchestra, London, England
Next to Leading Order, in the scientific context. This expression can be understood within the Taylor series formalism, referring to the second term of the series — though its use extends much further the Taylor series, which here has to be seen as an example only
NLO, Russian print issue 
Nobody Likes Onions, American podcast
Non-linear optical material
Norman Lockyer Observatory, Sidmouth, Devon, England
Nuffield Laboratory of Ophthalmology, Oxford, England
Russian and Bulgarian transliterated abbreviation for UFO
Wi-Fi Network List Offload